The Rochester Knighthawks were a lacrosse team based in Rochester, New York, that played in the National Lacrosse League (NLL). The 2015 season was the 21st in franchise history.

Regular season

Current standings

Game log

Roster

Transactions

Trades

Entry Draft
The 2014 NLL Entry Draft took place on September 22, 2014. The Knighthawks made the following selections:

See also
2015 NLL season

References

Rochester Knighthawks seasons
Rochester
Rochester Knighthawks